Simon Friedli (born 22 July 1991) is a Swiss bobsledder. He competed in the two-man event at the 2018 Winter Olympics. He also competed in both the two-man event and the four-man event at the 2022 Winter Olympics.

References

External links
 

1991 births
Living people
Swiss male bobsledders
Olympic bobsledders of Switzerland
Bobsledders at the 2018 Winter Olympics
Bobsledders at the 2022 Winter Olympics
Place of birth missing (living people)
21st-century Swiss people